Aleksey Alekseyevich Plotnikov (born 31 July 1998) is a Russian footballer. He plays for FC Dynamo Saint Petersburg.

Club career
He made his debut in the Russian Football National League for FC Zenit-2 Saint Petersburg on 24 March 2018 in a game against FC Fakel Voronezh.

References

External links
 Profile by Russian Football National League

1998 births
Footballers from Saint Petersburg
Living people
Russian footballers
Association football defenders
FC Zenit-2 Saint Petersburg players
FC Dynamo Saint Petersburg players
Russian First League players
Russian Second League players